Lycus (Lykos, Lycos ,) may refer to:

Mythology 
 Lycus (mythology), the name of numerous people in Greek mythology, including
 Lycus (brother of Nycteus), a ruler of the ancient city of Ancient Thebes
 Lycus (descendant of Lycus), son of Lycus (brother of Nycteus), appearing in Euripides's Heracles
 Lycus, son of Poseidon

Rivers 
 Lycos or Great Zab, a river of Assyria, located in modern-day Turkey and Iraq
 Lycus (river of Bithynia), flows into the Black Sea (Pontus Euxinus) near Heraclea Pontica
 Lycus (river of Cilicia), flows from the Pyramus to the Pinarus
 Lycus, now known as Kouris, in Cyprus that flows into the Mediterranean Sea at Kourion
 Lycus (river of Lydia), a tributary of the Hyllus river
 Lycus (river of Mysia), near Carseae
 Lycus (river of Phoenicia), also known as Nahr al-Kalb, flows into the Mediterranean near Beirut
 Lycus (river of Phrygia), a historical river, a tributary of the Maeander
 Lycus (river of Pontus), modern Kelkit, a river in the Black Sea Region of Turkey and the longest tributary of the Yeşil River
 Platani (river), a river of Sicily, was sometimes also called the Lycus.
Lycus (river of Constantinople), a stream on the Byzantine peninsula that flowed into the Harbour of Theodosius in Constantinople on the Propontis: now Yenikapı, Istanbul.

Fictional characters 
 Karl Lykos, a Marvel Comics villain also known as Sauron
 Lycus, a DC Comics villain and son of Ares (DC Comics)

Other uses
 Lycus (beetle), a genus of net-winged beetles

See also 
 Battle of the Lycus, fought in 66 BC between the Roman Republic army of Pompey and the forces of Mithridates VI of Pontus
 Lycos, a search engine and Web portal
 Lycus Sulci, a feature in the Amazonis quadrangle on Mars